Julie Dorne Thomas is the inaugural Chief Minister of Saint Helena. 

Thomas was elected to the role on 25 October 2021 by the Legislative Council following the 2021 Saint Helena general election, in which she received the most votes out of all candidates.

See also
List of first women governors and chief ministers
List of female constituent and dependent territory leaders

References 

Living people
Date of birth missing (living people)
Year of birth missing (living people)
Chief Ministers of Saint Helena
Members of the Legislative Council of Saint Helena
Saint Helenian women in politics
Saint Helena, Ascension and Tristan da Cunha women in politics
21st-century women politicians
Women governors and heads of sub-national entities
Women heads of government of non-sovereign entities